The 2009–10 Israeli Noar Leumit League was the sixteenth season since its introduction in 1994. It is the top-tier football in Israel for teenagers between the ages 18–20. It began on 14 August 2009 and ended on 29 May 2010.

Maccabi Haifa won the title, whilst Hapoel Petah Tikva and Hakoah Amidar Ramat Gan were relegated.

League table

References

External links
Israel Football Association

 

Israeli Noar Premier League seasons
Noar Leumit League